Peperomia hoffmannii is a species of plant in the genus Peperomia of the family Piperaceae. Its native range reaches from Mexico to Peru.

References

hoffmannii
Flora of Peru
Flora of Mexico
Flora of Colombia